The 1896 Colgate football team represented Colgate University in the 1896 college football season. The team captain for the 1896 season was Warwick Ford.

Schedule

References

Colgate
Colgate Raiders football seasons
Colgate football